The 2019–20 Khuzestan Premier League season is be the 20th season of the Khuzestan Premier League which began on August 25, 2019 with 15 teams competing from the province of Khuzestan. Teams will play home and away with one another each playing 30 matches. The league champion will be promoted to League 3 while the last place team will be relegated to the Khuzestan Division 1 league.

League changes

Since 2 teams were relegated from the 2018-19 season to the Khuzestan Division 1 league, 2 teams were promoted from Division 1 up to the Khuzestan premier league for 2019-20. Parsa Bagh-e Malek did not return this season for unknown reasons. Eftekhar Shushtar was promoted to League 3 after winning the Khuzestan Premier League last year.

Teams

Final standings

Results

See also 

 2019–20 Azadegan League
 2018–19 League 2
 2018–19 League 3
 2019–20 Hazfi Cup
 2020 Iranian Super Cup

References 

1
Iran
Khuzestan Premier League